Benzol may refer to:
 Benzole, a coal-tar product consisting mainly of benzene and toluene
 Benzene, a chemical compound with the formula C6H6
 Benzol peroxide, benzoyl peroxide
 Benzoyl group, a functional group with the formula C6H5CO
 Benzyl group, a molecular fragment with the formula C6H5CH2
 Phenol (systematically named Benzenol), an aromatic organic compound with the molecular formula C6H5OH
 Benzoic acid, an acidic compound with the formula C6H5COOH
 Benzyl alcohol, an alcohol with the formula C6H5CH2OH
 Cresol (also called Benzol), also known as hydroxytoluene, a group of isomeric alcohols

See also
 National Benzole, a petroleum brand used in the UK from 1919 to the 1960s